William Penn "Pop" Gates (August 30, 1917 – December 1, 1999) was an American professional basketball player.

Early life
He was born in Decatur, Alabama and attended high school in New York, New York. During high school studies he earned All-Conference honors in both 1937 and 1938 and made the All-City first team in 1938, as well as won 3 All-City titles with YMCA teams. Some later newspaper publications claimed that Gates graduated from Clark College (now Clark Atlanta University), but in fact his professional basketball career started right after graduating from Franklin High School.

Basketball career
Gates started his professional basketball career with the New York Renaissance, beginning in 1938–39. "Seven months before Jackie Robinson made his debut for the Brooklyn Dodgers, Leo Ferris helped usher in a new era of racial integration for professional basketball when he signed Pop Gates, who made his debut for the Tri-Cities Blackhawks in October 1946.

Gates, along with William "Dolly" King, were the first two African-American players in the National Basketball League (NBL) in 1946. "When Leo Ferris came to me, it was like a godsend", Gates was quoted as saying in the book "Pioneers of the Hardwood: Indiana and the Birth of Professional Basketball." "It was a real highlight of my career to be accepted by the NBL as one of only two blacks in the league."

Later Gates played for and coached the Harlem Globetrotters. He is one of the few athletes who went directly from a high school championship team (Benjamin Franklin, New York, 1938) to a world professional champion (New York Rens, 1939).

Awards and honors
Gates was inducted into the Naismith Memorial Basketball Hall of Fame as a player in 1989.

References

External links
"William Penn "Pop" Gates" at the Naismith Memorial Basketball Hall of Fame

1917 births
1999 deaths
20th-century African-American sportspeople
African-American basketball players
American men's basketball players
Basketball players from Alabama
Basketball players from New York (state)
Dayton Rens coaches
Dayton Rens players
Guards (basketball)
Harlem Globetrotters coaches
Harlem Globetrotters players
Naismith Memorial Basketball Hall of Fame inductees
New York Renaissance players
Player-coaches
Scranton Miners (basketball) players
Sportspeople from Decatur, Alabama
Tri-Cities Blackhawks players